Develin Peak is a  peak in British Columbia, Canada, with a prominence of . 
It is part of the Tower of London Range of the Muskwa Ranges in the Canadian Rockies, to the north the Wokkpash Glacier.

References

Bibliography

Two-thousanders of British Columbia
Canadian Rockies
Peace River Land District